Seven Springs Mountain Resort is an all-season resort located in the borough of Seven Springs, Pennsylvania. Activities include biking, canopy touring, ziplining, sporting clays, fishing, hiking and golfing in the summer and skiing, snowboarding and snow tubing in the winter. The ski season at Seven Springs typically begins on the day after Thanksgiving and continues to mid-April, weather permitting.

Seven Springs hosts events such as the adventure race Mud on the Mountain, Brewski Fest, Fireworks and Food Trucks, Rib and Wing Festival, Wine Festival, Autumnfest and Pond Skim. 

In 2021, Seven Springs became part of Vail Resorts.

Slope statistics
Source:
 Mountain elevation:  (top),  (base)
 Highest vertical drop: 
 Average snowfall per year: 
 Lift capacity per hour: 24,900
 Average temperature: 
 Skiable terrain: 
 Total number of slopes and trails: 33
 Total number of parks and pipes: 7 (7 parks, 2 pipes)
 Longest trail: "Lost Boy" ( / )
 Lifts (capacity per seat):
Avalanche lift (4)
Tyrol lift (3)
Cortina lift (4)
Polar Bear Express (6)
Blitzen lift (3)
North Pole lift (4)
North Face lift (4)
Giant Steps lift (3)
Gunnar Express (6)
Southwind lift (3)
 Surface lifts:
Stowe's Beginner Conveyor
Tyrol Conveyor
Easy Rider Conveyor
Santa's Beard Rope Tow

Lift statistics

Source:

In all, there are ten chairlifts, three conveyors and one rope tow.

History

1932 
In 1932, German immigrants Adolph and Helen Dupre bought 2.5 acres and founded Seven Springs farm on the site of the later resort. The Dupres installed a rope tow for local skiers, and eventually expanded to multiple lifts, which became the Seven Springs Resort.

2007
In fall 2007, the hotel at Seven Springs received a full renovation and redecoration. All 414 hotel rooms were planned for refurbishment. Seven Springs chose George Conte Designs of Greensburg, Pennsylvania, to perform the renovation. The rooms were remodeled in their entirety, with new bedding, carpets, curtains, doors, tables, desks and chairs. There is an LCDTV in each room with a multimedia jack to connect digital devices.

Another project opened in 2007 was a second high-speed six-passenger chairlift serving the Gunnar slope at the North Face. It takes skiers and snowboarders to the top of the mountain in three minutes, in comparison to twelve minutes on the previous chairlift. The Gunnar Express Lift was constructed in place of the Gunnar Triple Chairlift.

Construction for the hotel and the chairlift were fully completed and open to guests for use in time for the 2007-08 skiing season

2008
Several projects arose for the 2008-09 winter ski season at Seven Springs. Improvements and additions to the slopes, trails and terrain parks were among the many plans made for the resort. Construction for other major projects, including the addition of a full-service sporting clays facility including two courses, a sub-gauge course and a five-stand, an outdoor swimming pool and spa facility, also began. That summer, the resort's first downhill mountain biking course opened.

2009
The resort opened its new Trillium Spa, an eight-room spa with relaxation room and couple's suite. The new sporting clays facility also opened. Both projects have geothermal heating and cooling systems.

Greening techniques extended to the snowmaking technologies. Eco-friendly snowmaking upgrades were made with the installation of electric compressors instead of diesel compressors. The switch saved the consumption of more than 100,000 gallons of diesel fuel.

A solar-powered snowmaking technique was implemented. The resort's snowmaking team developed a solar-panel to float in the largest snowmaking pond as a way to temper the water for easier, more efficient snowmaking.

Transworld Snowboarding magazine ranked the resort as the East Coast's top halfpipe and third place terrain parks.

2010
The 2010–2011 winter ski and snowboard season was marked with Transworld Snowboarding magazine again selecting Seven Springs as the East Coast's best halfpipe and moving up its terrain parks to tops as well.

2011
Two new facilities opened in summer 2011: summer tubing, which is very similar to snow tubing but without the snow, and the resort's first zipline, the Screaming Hawk. The ziplines range from 350 feet to 777 feet and include a set of air stairs.

Winter amenities also received an upgrade. With six terrain parks of varying difficulty and progression and more than 50 features in all, Seven Springs opened the first-ever urban terrain. The new park, presented by Forum Snowboards, is called The Streets Urban Park at Seven Springs. The park was designed to replicate downtown Pittsburgh.

TransWorld Snowboarding honored Seven Springs as the East Coast's top terrain parks and North America's number four halfpipe. The superpipe was also expanded in 2011-2012 to an Olympic-sized pipe with 22-foot high walls.

A new beginner snowboarding area complete with a conveyor was also opened near the base of Stowe Slope. The rental center underwent a major renovation and featured a new partnership with Rossignol that included a new fleet of skis, boots and poles.

2012
In May 2012, the resort opened its first canopy tour, the Laurel Ridgeline Zipline Tour, with Bonsai, Inc. It focuses on the environment and ecology of the region and consists of two air stairs, treetops between 50 and 80 feet high and ten ziplines ranging in length from 145 to 1,500 feet.

2021 
On December 31, 2021, Vail Resorts announced it had acquired Seven Springs, Hidden Valley Resort, and Laurel Mountain Ski Area for approximately $118 million.

Gallery

See also
 List of ski areas and resorts in the United States

References

External links

 Seven Springs Mountain Resort  official web site
 Trail map

Buildings and structures in Somerset County, Pennsylvania
Pittsburgh metropolitan area
Ski areas and resorts in Pennsylvania
Tourist attractions in Somerset County, Pennsylvania
Vail Resorts